Eduard Zeinalov (21 July 1963 in Oleksandria) is a Ukrainian politician. He was an authorized representative in Kirovohrad Oblast for the presidential candidate Viktor Yushchenko.

References

External links
 Eduard Zeinalov at the Official Ukraine Today portal

1963 births
Living people
People from Oleksandriia
Ukrainian people of Azerbaijani descent
Governors of Kirovohrad Oblast
Our Ukraine (political party) politicians
European Party of Ukraine politicians
Sixth convocation members of the Verkhovna Rada
Fifth convocation members of the Verkhovna Rada